Whisper is the second mini-album by South Korean pop duo VIXX LR, sub-unit of the boy band VIXX . The EP was released on August 28, 2017 under the label of Jellyfish Entertainment.

Background and composition
On July 19, 2017, Jellyfish Entertainment announced that VIXX LR is aiming to make a comeback and release a new album in August.  On August 14, VIXX LR announced that their second mini album Whisper would be released on August 28, 2017. The album contains five tracks all of which are written and composed by either Ravi or Leo. On August 22, VIXX shared a highlight medley with snippets of all the songs from the album, followed by a teaser of the official music video on August 25, 2017.

Promotion
VIXX LR will begin promoting Whisper with a comeback showcase on VLIVE on August 28. Followed by performances on The Show on SBS MTV, Show Champion on MBC Music, M! Countdown on Mnet, Music Bank on KBS, Show! Music Core on MBC and Inkigayo on SBS.

Track listing
The credits are adapted from the official homepage of the group.

Chart performance

Release history

See also
 List of K-pop albums on the Billboard charts
 List of Gaon Album Chart number ones of 2017

References

External links
 
 Whisper - EP by VIXX LR on iTunes

2017 EPs
VIXX albums
Korean-language EPs
Jellyfish Entertainment EPs
Stone Music Entertainment EPs